Andrew Meisner (born March 30, 1973) is a politician from Huntington Woods, Michigan. He is a former Democratic Party member of the Michigan State House of Representatives. He served as the Oakland County Treasurer from 2009 to 2021. Meisner was a candidate for Oakland County Executive in 2020, but was defeated in the August Democratic primary.

Early life
While in college, Meisner was an aide to Congressmen Sander Levin and David Obey. After graduating, he became Congressman Levin's policy analyst for issues concerning criminal justice, mental health, unemployment insurance, and foreign affairs. Meisner was then elected vice president of the national, non-profit Drug-Free Kids Campaign, or CADCA.

In 2001, Meisner returned to Michigan to work as a corporate communications director for a real estate firm.

Political career
Meisner was elected to the Michigan House of Representatives in 2002. Since then he has become the Assistant Democratic Leader and the Vice-Chair of the House Commerce Committee and Ethics, Oversight and Campaign Finance Committee, and serving as a member of the Tax Policy Committee.

Meisner was awarded the "Rising Star Award" in 2005 from the 21st Century Democrats. Meisner is an advocate for easing restrictions on embryonic stem cell research.

After serving the maximum number of 3 terms in the State House under term limits, in November 2008, Meisner successfully ran against the incumbent Oakland County Treasurer.

In September 2009, Governor Granholm named Meisner to the Michigan Land Bank Fast Track Authority 

In November 2012, Meisner ran for re-election against term-limited State Representative Marty Knollenberg (R)-Troy, winning by 7 points.

In 2020, Meisner was a candidate for Oakland County Executive, but lost in the August Democratic primary.

Electoral history

References

External links
Andy Meisner's Web Site
Andy Meisner's Michigan House Democrats Web Site
The Michigan House Democrats Web Site
Attorney Mark Brewer of Goodman Acker, P.C.

Living people
Jewish American state legislators in Michigan
Democratic Party members of the Michigan House of Representatives
People from Ferndale, Michigan
1973 births
Place of birth missing (living people)
21st-century American Jews